Among Us VR is a social deduction video game developed by Schell Games, Innersloth, and Robot Teddy. It was published by Innersloth in November 2022 for Meta Quest 2 and Windows via several SteamVR-supported headsets. A PlayStation 5 version via PlayStation VR2 was planned for February 2023, but did not release in that timeframe. The gameplay is similar to the original Among Us, though it is played in virtual reality and is in first-person perspective.

Gameplay 

Among Us VR is a multiplayer game with two teams, Crewmates and Impostors. Crewmates must complete a wide variety of tasks in order to meet their win condition. Impostors appear identical in every way to Crewmates, although they can be distinguished by other Impostors. Their goal is to kill all Crewmate players without getting caught, and may utilize tools to aid them, such as sabotaging a part of the ship that the Crewmates must fix or using ventilation shafts to quickly navigate the playing area.

If any player sees a dead body, they will have the choice to start a meeting with other players. The players, called crewmates, must survive on the spaceship. They then can discuss who the Impostor may be, and cast a vote towards who they think it is. Unless players choose to skip the vote, one player will be "ejected" from the ship and it will be revealed if they were an Impostor or not. The ejected player and other dead players can continue the game as a ghost, who cannot communicate with living players, kill, or report a dead body.

Lobbies support up to 10 players at a time. The player has the ability to customize their character with different hats and other cosmetics. In-game, proximity chat is used for communication purposes. Players can also use the quick chat feature and high five other players. Unlike the original game, Among Us VR is played in a first-person perspective and adds new tasks such as a Whac-A-Mole styled task. Among Us VR also introduces a new map, known as The Skeld 2.

Development and release 
The announcement trailer officially premiered in The Game Awards 2021. In August 2022, an open beta was announced. Among Us VR was released on November 10, 2022 for the Meta Quest 2 and for Windows via Steam. The Windows version supports the Valve Index, HTC Vive, Oculus Rift, and Windows Mixed Reality families of headsets via SteamVR. Those who preordered on the Meta Quest Store received a Mini Crewmate hat. The game was planned for release on the PlayStation 5 via the PlayStation VR2 alongside the release of the headset on February 22, 2023 before being delayed. During an interview, the developers of the game said that they "had to think carefully about how to adapt kill actions, so that they weren’t too spooky and horror-like for players."

Reception 

Among Us VR received "generally favorable" reviews from critics, according to review aggregator Metacritic. 

Giovanni Colantonio from Digital Trends says that "Among Us VR offers the ideal version of the deduction title, but it’s going to be a much lonelier one, too". Henry Stockdale of IGN gave Among Us VR an 8/10 review, stating "Among Us VR is a great ground-up reworking of a classic social game that feels right at home in virtual reality, remaining faithful to Innersloth’s hit while feeling fresh in a new perspective and with a few sneaky new tricks in play. Hamish Hector from TechRadar stated that "if you own a VR headset, this is a must-play title". Ian Hamilton of UploadVR gave it a "recommended" verdict, calling it "an absolute thrill" and "top tier VR design", and noting that "claustrophobia closes in when the lights go out and you need to push down a dark hallway. Fear and confusion mix when undertaking the tasks in front of you, just like the traditional version of the game." Corey Plante of Inverse considered the game "a must-play virtual reality title that vastly improves on the original in every way". The game was praised by Dave McQuilling of SlashGear for its online experience and simple controls while criticizing its missing features and bugs.  Cameron Swan from Game Rant praised the game as "Among Us VR absolutely nails what it set out to do".

Awards

Sales 
As of January 24, 2023, Among Us VR had sold over one million copies. According to Innersloth, the game has been played more than 4 million times averaging 44,000 matches a day with players.

References

External links 
 

2022 video games
Indie video games
Meta Quest games
Multiplayer online games
Party video games
PlayStation 5 games
PlayStation VR2 games
Science fiction video games
Social deduction video games
Video games developed in the United States
Video games set in outer space
Virtual reality games
Windows games